Robert Francis Dudgeon  (23 September 1851 – 4 October 1901) was Lord-Lieutenant of Kirkcudbrightshire from 1908 until his death, in 1901.

He was educated at Rugby and Trinity College, Cambridge. He served in the HM Reserve Forces for 43 years; ;Director of the Highland and Agricultural Society, 23 years; Vice-Convener of Kirkudbright County Council for 21 years; Governor of the West of Scotland Agricultural College for 14 years; Chairman of the Kirkcudbright School Board for 13 years; and a JP for Dumfriesshire for 8 years. 

His son was also a distinguished public servant.

References

1851 births
1932 deaths
People educated at Rugby School
Alumni of Trinity College, Cambridge
Companions of the Order of the Bath
Lord-Lieutenants of Kirkcudbright